[Percival] Bruce Judd (2 May 1907 – 3 January 1969) was an Australian Rugby Union player and represented for the Wallabies 11 times. He attended Newington College (1920–1924).

References

1907 births
1969 deaths
People educated at Newington College
Rugby union forwards
Australian rugby union players
Australia international rugby union players